Leposavić also known as Leposaviq or Albanik ( or Albaniku), is a town and the northernmost municipality in the Mitrovica District in Kosovo. As of 2015, it has an estimated population of 18,600 inhabitants.

It is a part of North Kosovo, a region with an ethnic Serb majority that functions largely autonomously from the remainder of ethnic Albanian-majority Kosovo. After the 2013 Brussels Agreement, the municipality is expected to become part of the Community of Serb Municipalities.

History

From 1877 to 1913 Leposavić was part of Kosovo vilayet.

Yugoslavia (1918–92)
After the First Balkan War (1912), Kosovo was internationally recognised as a part of Serbia and northern Metohija as a part of Montenegro at the Treaty of London in May 1913. In 1918, the Kingdom of Serbs, Croats and Slovenes, later named Yugoslavia was established by the merging of the Western South Slavic states. Between 1929 and 1941, the region was administratively part of the Zeta Banovina.

Lešak, Belo Brdo, Vračevo, Berberište were incorporated into the Leposavić municipality in 1953.

In the mid–1950s, the Assembly of PR Serbia decided that the Leposavić municipality be ceded to Autonomous Region of Kosovo and Metohija, after requests by the Kosovo leadership. It had up until then been part of the Kraljevo srez, of which the population was wholly Serb. After this, the number of Serbs drastically fell. In 1959, Leposavić was incorporated into the province.

Modern
After the NATO bombing of Yugoslavia, the political group Pokret za Leposavić ("Movement for Leposavić") was established, which sought to bring together those committed to cooperation and communication with the international community and the Albanians.

The municipality assembly joined the Association of Serb Municipalities and Settlements of Kosovo and Metohija in 2003, which exercised legislative and executive authority over North Kosovo and other Serb enclaves.

Name
Although historically known as Leposavić in Serbian and Leposaviq in Albanian and being an area of Serbian settlement, the town has been referred to as Albanik on some maps produced by KFOR since Kosovo's declaration of independence. Albanik is preferred over Leposaviq in Kosovar governmental documents translated into English.

Settlements
Aside from the town of Leposavić, the municipality includes the following villages:

 Bare
 Belo Brdo
 Beluće
 Berberište
 Bistrica
 Borova
 Borčane
 Brzance
 Vitanoviće
 Vračevo
 Vuča
 Gnježdane
 Gornji Krnjin
 Graničane
 Grkaje
 Guvnište
 Gulije
 Desetak
 Dobrava
 Donje Isevo
 Donji Krnjin
 Dren
 Duboka
 Zabrđe
 Zavrata
 Zemanica
 Zrnosek
 Ibarsko Postenje
 Jarinje
 Jelakce
 Jošanica
 Kajkovo
 Kamenica
 Kijevčiće
 Koporiće
 Kostin Potok
 Košutica
 Košutovo
 Kruševo
 Kruščica
 Kutnje
 Lazine
 Lešak
 Lozno
 Majdevo
 Mekiniće
 Miokoviće
 Mioliće
 Mošnica
 Ostraće
 Plakaonica
 Planinica
 Popovce
 Potkomlje
 Pridvorica
 Rvatska
 Rodelj
 Rucmance
 Seoce
 Slatina
 Sočanica
 Tvrđan
 Trebiće
 Trikose
 Ćirkoviće
 Ulije
 Ceranja
 Crveni
 Crnatovo
 Šaljska Bistrica

Demographics

According to the 2011 estimations by the Government of Kosovo, Leposavić has 4,193 households and 13,773 inhabitants. In 2015 report by OSCE, the population of Leposavić municipality stands at 18,600 inhabitants. Municipality of Leposavić includes town and 72 villages.

Ethnic groups
The majority of Leposavić municipality is composed of Kosovo Serbs with around 18,000 inhabitants (96.4%), while 350 Bosniaks and 270 Kosovo Albanians live in the municipality. Kosovo Albanians live in the three southern villages of Košutovo, Šaljska Bistrica, and Ceranje.

The ethnic composition of the municipality of Leposavić, including IDPs:

Economy
Almost all industrial facilities are closed or work with reduced capacity. The unemployment rate is also high, and it has been considerably increased due to the closing down of most of the Trepča conglomerate facilities. The municipality is rich in natural, infrastructure and management, but current circumstances blocked all the potentials. The municipality adopted the Development Agenda 2006 – 2009, in cooperation with United Nations Office for Project Services and with the support of UNMIK and the Italian Government, which foresees improvement in the local economy.  However, with the current difficult situation, there is not much hope that the agenda will be properly implemented. The municipality, led by a very proactive chief executive officer, pays noteworthy efforts toward identifying and initiating projects ideas.

There are three lead and zinc mines operating on the territory of Leposavić: Belo Brdo, Crepulje and Crnac.

Cultural monuments

The municipality has several monuments protected by the Republic of Serbia as part of the cultural heritage list.

The following Serbian Orthodox churches are located in Leposavić:
 Sočanica Monastery
 Vračevo Monastery
 Church of Cosmas and Damian
 Church of St. Basil of Ostrog

Gallery

See also
 North Kosovo
 Community of Serb Municipalities
 District of Mitrovica
Kosovska Mitrovica District

Notes and references
Notes

References

Sources

External links

 Official website

 
Populated places in the District of Mitrovica
North Kosovo
Municipalities of Kosovo
Cities in Kosovo